Outer Kitsissut (old spelling Ydre Kitsigsut), also known as Thorstein Islands or Torstein Islands, is an island group in the Kujalleq municipality in southern Greenland.

Geography
It is a compact cluster of small islets and rocks, with a length of 10 km and a width of 5 km. The highest and largest islet is Thorstein Island in the centre of the group, having a maximum length of about 0.7 km with a maximum height of 116 m.

The Inner Kitsissut group lies 4 km to the northeast of the northern end of the cluster at the mouth of the Coppermine Bay.

See also
List of islands of Greenland

References

External links
 Torstein Islands (Ydre Kitsissut) / Kujalleq
Uninhabited islands of Greenland
Kujalleq